Sterling City Independent School District is a public school district based in Sterling City, Texas, United States.

In 2009, the school district was rated "recognized" by the Texas Education Agency.

Schools
Sterling City High School (grades 9-12)
Sterling City Junior High (grades 6-8)
Sterling City Elementary (kindergarten-grade 5)

Athletics
Sterling City High School plays six-man football.

See also

List of school districts in Texas

References

External links
 Sterling City ISD

School districts in Sterling County, Texas